Thomas Edward Doherty (born 17 March 1979 in Bristol) is a Northern Ireland international footballer who plays as a midfielder.

Club career
Doherty started his career at Bristol City, making 189 league appearances in nine years. He was part of the side that won the 2003 Football League Trophy Final, before moving to Queens Park Rangers in 2005. He joined Wycombe on loan from QPR in September 2006 and was named in the PFA League Two Team of the Year for the 2006–07 season. He was also named the supporters official player of the year.

In the summer of 2007 Wycombe tried to sign him but for many reasons a deal was never agreed. He then suffered an illness whilst on holiday which put an end to negotiations. Doherty re-joined the club on another loan deal in October 2007 and joined the club permanently in January 2008 when he was released from QPR. Further impressive performances from Doherty saw Wycombe promoted to Football League One as well as himself being named in the PFA League Two Team of the Year for the second time at the end of the 2008–09 season.

On 30 January 2010, Doherty signed a contract with Ferencvárosi TC until the end of the season. He made his debut in a friendly against Gozo F.C. in which Ferencvárosi won 11–0.

It was announced on 28 May 2010, that Doherty would be signing with English League Two side Bradford City on a two-year contract. He was released from his contract on 4 May 2011, with immediate effect.

Doherty signed for Newport County on 11 June 2011 and was released by Newport in January 2012. In February 2012, Doherty signed a non-contract deal with Conference National side Bath City.

International career
Despite being born in England, Doherty qualified to play for Northern Ireland through his grandfather who was from Derry. Having played for the Northern Ireland B team against Scotland Future in May 2003, he made his full international debut against Italy the following month. He made eight further appearances for his country, the last of which was against England in March 2005.

Honours
Individual
PFA Team of the Year: 2006–07 Football League Two, 2008–09 Football League Two

References

External links

1979 births
Living people
Footballers from Bristol
Association football midfielders
Association footballers from Northern Ireland
Northern Ireland international footballers
Bristol City F.C. players
Queens Park Rangers F.C. players
Yeovil Town F.C. players
Wycombe Wanderers F.C. players
Bradford City A.F.C. players
Newport County A.F.C. players
Bath City F.C. players
Exeter City F.C. players
Expatriate footballers in Hungary
Ferencvárosi TC footballers
National League (English football) players
Nemzeti Bajnokság I players